Palsana railway station is a railway station in Sikar district, Rajasthan. Its code is PLSN. It serves Palsana town. The station consists of 2 platforms. Passenger, Express trains halt here.

References

Railway stations in Sikar district
Jaipur railway division